Julcán District is one of four districts in Julcán Province in Peru.

References